Torta caprese is a traditional Italian cake made with chocolate and either almonds or hazelnuts. Named for the island of Capri from which it originates, the cake is widely known and especially popular in nearby Naples, Italy.

With many variations, the core recipe combines softened butter at room temperature with sugar followed by egg yolks. Once combined, the remaining ingredients are added, including finely minced almonds, chocolate (melted using a bain-marie), and whipped egg whites. After baking, the cake has a moist interior with a thin, hard shell—typically dusted with powdered sugar. It is sometimes made with a small amount of Strega or other liqueur.

History
The origins of Torta caprese are not clear, though it seems likely it was created by the hospitality industry of Capri, which catered to tourists.

One background story suggests Caprese cake was created when the King of Naples' Austrian wife requested a Sacher cake (an Austrian chocolate cake), Neapolitan chefs improvised by using a typical Neopolitan ingredient, almonds. Another unauthenticated story suggests Caprese cake was created in the 1920s when a baker fulfilling a tourist's order for an almond cake, mistakenly forgot to add flour—resulting in a simultaneously soft and crunchy delicacy. Another account attributes the recipe to two Austrian women who inherited a guest house in Capri's Marina Piccola during the 1930s, the Strandpension Weber, from Munich-born August Weber (1846–1928).  

Despite the uncertainty surrounding its origins, Caprese tort has been called "uno dei pasticci più fortunati della storia" (one of history's most fortunate mistakes).

See also
 List of almond dishes
 List of desserts

References

Italian cakes
Italian pastries
Chocolate desserts
Cuisine of Campania
Capri, Campania
Almond desserts